The Rural Municipality of Wallace is a former rural municipality (RM) in the Canadian province of Manitoba. It was originally incorporated as a rural municipality on December 22, 1883. It ceased on January 1, 2015 as a result of its provincially mandated amalgamation with the RM of Woodworth and the Village of Elkhorn to form the Rural Municipality of Wallace – Woodworth.

The former RM surrounds the Town of Virden.

Communities 
 Hargrave
 Harmsworth
 Kirkella
 Kola
 Maples
 Two Creeks

Reeves

References

External links 
 Rural Municipality of Wallace (copy archived February 19, 2015)
 Manitoba Municipalities: Rural Municipality of Wallace
 Map of Wallace R.M. at Statcan

Wallace
Populated places disestablished in 2015
2015 disestablishments in Manitoba